The Moray Council is one of the 32 local government councils in Scotland covering the Moray area.

History
The Moray District Council had been created in 1975 under the Local Government (Scotland) Act 1973. It became one of the newly created single tier local authorities in 1996, under the Local Government etc. (Scotland) Act 1994.

Council structure

The council's executive branch is headed by a Leader of the Council, who is the leader of the largest political grouping.

Wards

Buckie
Elgin City North
Elgin City South
Fochabers Lhanbryde
Forres
Heldon & Laich
Keith & Cullen
Speyside Glenlivet

References

 

Local authorities of Scotland
Politics of Moray
Organisations based in Moray
Elgin, Moray